Augustus William West,  J.P. (22 July 1813 in Dublin – 3 March 1893 in Presteigne) was a nineteenth century Anglican priest, most notably Dean of Ardagh from 1860 until 1880.
 
He was educated at Trinity College, Dublin. He was for many years Rector of Blessington; and  Chancellor of Kildare. He also held the living of Presteigne.

Notes

1813 births
1893 deaths
Alumni of Trinity College Dublin
19th-century Irish Anglican priests
Deans of Ardagh